Lysite (also Lysaght) is an unincorporated community in northeastern Fremont County, Wyoming, United States.  It lies along local roads northeast of the city of Lander, the county seat of Fremont County.  Lysite has a post office.  The Bridger Trail passed near Lysite on its way north to the gold fields of Montana in the 19th century.

Geography
During a drought in 1960, Lysite recorded  of precipitation for the entire calendar year. This was the lowest annual precipitation total recorded in Wyoming, and the lowest anywhere in the United States outside the Southwest.

Climate

Economy
It also has Lost Cabin Gas Plant and Madden natural gas field, owned and operated by Contango Resources.

Arts and culture
The J.B. Okie mansion is located in Lysite. Lysite has an old one room schoolhouse, library, and a general store. Most of the residents own cows and horses, and most residents have some background in agriculture. Every summer the community hosts a series of mini rodeos called the gymkhanas. On Labor Day, Lysite hosts a large rodeo, including a night of Ranch Rodeo.

Education
Public education in the community of Lysite is provided by Fremont County School District #24. The district has three campuses – Shoshoni Elementary School (grades PK-6), Shoshoni Junior High School (grades 7–8) and Shoshoni High School (grades 9–12).

References

Unincorporated communities in Fremont County, Wyoming
Unincorporated communities in Wyoming